= SCT Lubricants =

UAB SCT Lubricants
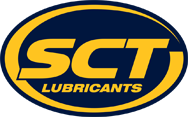
- Type: Private limited company
- Founded: 2003
- Headquarters: Klaipėda, Lithuania
- Products: Lubricants
- Operating income: 162.59 million EUROS (2020)
- Number of employees: 197 (2020)
- Website: sct-lubricants.com

UAB SCT Lubricants (Lithuanian: UAB; English: private limited liability company) is a manufacturer of automotive lubricants, greases and additives for the automotive aftermarket. The plant is located in the Baltic Sea port city of Klaipėda, Lithuania, with direct access to international shipping routes. Each year, more than 150,000 tonnes of lubricants are exported to 150 countries worldwide.

== History ==
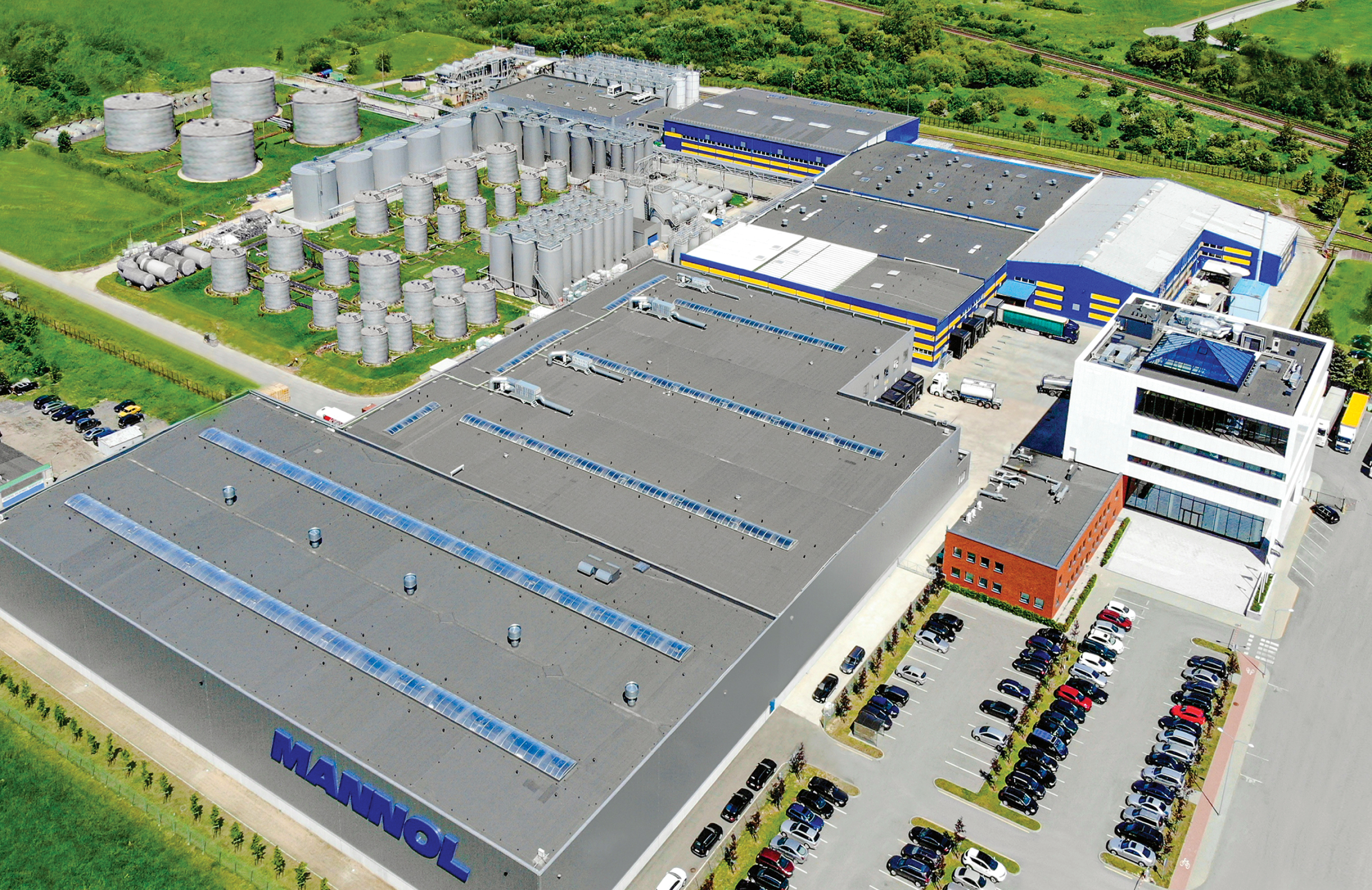
A bird’s-eye view of SCT Lubricants

The origins of the plant date back to 1962. It originally operated as fuel and oil tank depot. The depot remained in operation until 1993, when it was privatised and converted into a lubricants plant under the name PemcoKuras (Lithuanian: kuras; German: Kraftstoff; English: fuel). Under the new management, production of the first engine oil under the new name began in March 1994.

In 2003, the German company SCT-Vertriebs GmbH and Pemco Kuras began collaborating. SCT specialised in the sale of lubricants and automotive spare parts.

Following the acquisition of the plant by SCT-Vertriebs GmbH in 2003, the company was renamed UAB SCT Lubricants.

The company operates a quality and environmental management system in accordance with ISO 9001 and ISO 14001. In 2019, the in-house research and development team developed SCT ESTER technology, which enables the use of Group V ester base oils in the production of engine oils.

As part of its restructuring and expansion, SCT Lubricants began gradually introducing new filling lines in 2008, increasing the number of filling lines from 2 to the current total of 16. One year later, a new warehouse was built. In 2011, new blending systems and what is known as a pigging system for pipeline cleaning were installed.To allow the products to be tested on site, a laboratory was built in 2012. In the same year, in-house production of plastic containers also began. In-house production of metal containers was introduced in 2018. The plant currently has a total tank capacity of 40 million litres on a 10-hectare site.

== Products ==
Its products are distributed worldwide under the registered brand names MANNOL, FANFARO, PEMCO and CHEMPIOIL. Depending on the brand, the range includes automotive lubricants and specialty fluids, car care products, greases and car spare parts. In 2021, the product range was expanded to include SCT ESTER technology following its registration with the DPMA.
